ECSS may refer to: 

 European College of Sport Science, Cologne, Germany  
 European Cooperation for Space Standardization, Noordwijk, The Netherlands 
 Escambia County School System
 Escuela Catolica De San Sebastian, Manila, Philippines
 Enterprise Communications Support Services, an initiative of the FAA. ECSS-SB is ECSS for Small Business.
 Estuarine, Coastal and Shelf Science, an academic journal on ocean sciences
 Expeditionary Combat Support System, a failed enterprise resource planning software project undertaken by the United States Air Force (USAF) between 2005 and 2012